Julien Mazet (born 16 March 1981 in Villeneuve-sur-Lot) is a French former professional road bicycle racer.

Major results

2003
 1st  Time trial, National Under-23 Championships
 1st La Transalsace
 1st Trophée des Sources
2004
 4th Overall Giro della Valle d'Aosta
1st Stages 1 & 5
 4th Overall Vuelta a Navarra
2005
 1st Stage 1 Tour de la Manche
 4th Tour du Jura
 5th Overall Tour de la Somme
 6th Overall Tour du Limousin
 7th Overall Route du Sud
 9th Overall Tour de l'Ain
 9th Grand Prix d'Ouverture La Marseillaise
2006
 3rd Overall Route du Sud
 5th Overall Tour de l'Avenir
 5th Grand Prix Cristal Energie
 6th Tour du Jura
 9th Tour du Doubs
2007
 5th Overall Herald Sun Tour
2009
 2nd Tour du Doubs
 6th Overall Les 3 Jours de Vaucluse
 6th Cholet-Pays de Loire
 8th Tour du Finistère
2010
 6th Tour du Doubs

External links 

Profile at Team Astana official website

French male cyclists
1981 births
Living people
People from Villeneuve-sur-Lot
Sportspeople from Lot-et-Garonne
Cyclists from Nouvelle-Aquitaine